In Belgium, the French Community refers to one of the three constituent constitutional linguistic communities. Since 2011, the French Community has used the name  Wallonia-Brussels Federation, which is controversial because its name in the Belgian constitution has not changed and because it is seen as a political statement. The name "French Community" refers to Francophone Belgians, and not to French people residing in Belgium. As such, the French Community of Belgium is sometimes rendered in English as "the French-speaking Community of Belgium" for clarity, in analogy to the German-speaking Community of Belgium.

The Community has its own parliament, government, and administration. Its official flag is identical to the Walloon Flag, which is also the official flag of the Walloons of Wallonia.

Wallonia is home to 80% of all Francophone Belgians, with the remaining 20% residing in Brussels, which is the seat of parliament of the French Community.

Historically, this community spoke variants of Walloon, Dutch, Picard, Luxembourgish or Moselle Franconian German, but nowadays, the dominant language is overwhelmingly Belgian French, except for some areas alongside the border to the Grand-Duchy of Luxembourg (mainly the district called Land of Arlon or Arelerland), where Luxembourgish is still widely spoken.

Description
The French Community of Belgium includes 4.5 million people, of whom:
 3.6 million live in the Walloon Region (that is almost the entirety of the inhabitants of this region, apart from people who live in the German-speaking communes, who number around 70,000);
 900,000 living in the Brussels Capital Region (out of 1.2 million inhabitants).

French speakers who live in the Flemish Region are not included in the official numbers for the French-speaking Community, since the French Community has no jurisdiction in that region. Their number is unknown, given the absence of sub-nationality status and the discouragement of linguistic criteria in census-taking. Estimates of the French-speaking population of Flanders vary from 120,000, around 200,000, to around 300,000.

The French Community of Belgium makes up about 40% of the total population of Belgium; 60% of the population belongs to the Flemish Community, and 1% to the German-speaking Community.

Alternative name
For years there have been hints that the Community wanted to better demonstrate the link between Wallonia and Brussels, the two main territories where the French speakers are in the majority. These include the creation of several organisations such as Wallonie-Bruxelles International, a public body in charge of international cultural affairs set up jointly by the French Community, the Walloon Region and the Commission communautaire française (COCOF, a French-speaking institution of the Brussels-Capital Region). The concept of "Wallonie-Bruxelles" is however not mentioned in the Belgian constitution, and appeared only in a few official legal texts, such as the "Arrêté du Gouvernement de la Communauté française fixant le code de qualité et de l'accueil" of 17 December 2003, mentioning the name "Communauté Wallonie-Bruxelles", and the "Arrêté du Gouvernement de la Communauté française approuvant le programme quinquennal de promotion de la santé 2004–2008" of 30 April 2004, mentioning the name "Communauté française Wallonie-Bruxelles".

In May 2011, the parliament of the Community voted a resolution according to which it would, from then on, use the name "Wallonia-Brussels Federation" (French: "Fédération Wallonie-Bruxelles") for all its communications, campaigns and in the administration. The move was immediately interpreted as aggressive by the Flemish authorities, the Minister-President of Flanders announcing he would not recognize the federation as an official body and saying that documents that would be sent by the federation would be unconstitutional and therefore would not exist.
   
That name also obscures the fact that this institution does not represent the Flemings living in Brussels, nor their local Flemish Community Commission ('Vlaamse Gemeenschapscommissie', or VGC) nor the Brussels-Capital Region. 
  
While the authorities of the Community acknowledge the fact that the new name is not mentioned in the Belgian Constitution, they insist that their move is not illegal, as long as the new name is used as an additional name for the Community and is not used when it could create a legal issue (such as with the official texts published in the Belgian Official Journal).

Although the then Belgian Prime Minister Yves Leterme said that the federal government would not use the new name and the Flemish VRT decided not to use the new name in its news programs either, it is used by the French-speaking media, including the RTBF public network, which is fully controlled by the Community. The independent/private media uses both the alternative and the original designation.

In September 2011, the Community adopted a new logo that incorporates its new name.

Politics and government

The French Community of Belgium is governed by the Parliament of the French Community, which selects the executive branch, the Government of the French Community.

Parliament
It consists of all 75 members of the Walloon Parliament except German-speaking members (currently two) who are substituted by French-speaking members from the same party, and 19 members elected by the French linguistic group of the Parliament of the Brussels-Capital Region within the former body. These members are elected for a term of five years.

Current composition (2019-2024)

Note: Government coalition parties are denoted with bullets (•)

Executive
The Cabinet of the French Community of Belgium is the executive branch of the French Community, and it too sits in Brussels. It consists of a number of ministers chosen by the parliament and is headed by a Minister-President.

List of Ministers-President of the French Community

Religion
In 2016, 63% of residents of Brussels and Wallonia declared themselves Catholics, 15% were practising Catholics and 30% were non-practising Catholics, 4% were Muslim, 2% were Protestant, 2% were of another religion and 26% were non-religious.

See also
 Brussels-Capital Region
 Commission communautaire française (COCOF)
 Communities and regions of Belgium
 Wallonia

Notes

External links

 
 Parliament of the French Community of Belgium, official website (some information available in English)

 
Communities of Belgium
Society of Belgium
Politics of Brussels
Politics of Wallonia
French-speaking countries and territories